Wallkill is the name of some places in the U.S. state of New York:

Wallkill, Orange County, New York, a town
Wallkill, Ulster County, New York, a hamlet